Conestoga High School, located in Tredyffrin Township, Pennsylvania, is the only upper secondary school in the Tredyffrin/Easttown School District. It has a Berwyn post office address, though it is not in the Berwyn census-designated place.

College and university matriculation

97% of Conestoga graduates advance to colleges and universities, 92% of them to four-year colleges and universities. Graduating classes from 2009 to 2014 sent one or more students to each of the Ivy League colleges, Massachusetts Institute of Technology, Duke University, Johns Hopkins University, University of Chicago, The California Institute of Technology, Carnegie Mellon University, and The University of California, Berkeley.  The most popular university choice for Conestoga students is Pennsylvania State University. The second most popular choice is the University of Pittsburgh. Fifty-two percent of Conestoga students leave Pennsylvania to attend colleges and universities, and more than 52% attend private institutions after graduation.

Departments

Conestoga has eight academic departments: Business/Technology, English, World Languages, Mathematics, Science, Social Studies, Visual and Performing Arts, and Wellness/Fitness/Family & Consumer Science. Students must earn 24 credits in order to graduate. One credit is equivalent to a year-long class.

Distinctions and honors

In 2012 Conestoga was ranked the 180th best high school in the country and 1st in Pennsylvania by the Daily Beast. Conestoga was ranked 312th (3rd in Pennsylvania) in 2008, 301st (3rd in Pennsylvania) in 2007, 170th (1st in Pennsylvania) in 2006, 195th in 2005, and 197th in 2003.

In 2016, Niche.com ranked the Tredyffrin Easttown school district number one in the United States. In the 2016 edition of Newsweek's "America's Top High Schools", Conestoga High School was ranked 36th in the nation and the 1st in Pennsylvania.

For the 2012–2013 school year the school was ranked as a Gold Medal School by U.S. News & World Report, ranked number 313 nationally. U.S. News & World Report ranked Conestoga as a Gold Medal High School, the 294th of America's for 2021–2022.

SAT

The Conestoga Class of 2014 performed at least 94 points above the national average in every section of the SAT:

Compared to all the other schools in Chester County, Conestoga had the highest average SAT score in 2019.

National Merit/College Board Recognition

The Conestoga Class of 2022 includes 39 National Merit Semi-finalists, the most in Pennsylvania. The Conestoga Class of 2018 includes 34 National Merit Semi-finalists, 26 National Merit Commended students, and 2 National Hispanic Scholars. The Conestoga Class of 2009 includes 21 National Merit Semi-finalists, 35 National Merit Commended students, 1 National Achievement Scholar, and 1 National Hispanic Scholar award recipients.

Advanced Placement program

In May 2008, 573 Conestoga students, or 30% of the student body, took 1,103 College Board Advanced Placement (AP) examinations. A score of 3 or higher was earned on 95% of the tests.

The Siemens Foundation for Advanced Placement honored Conestoga thrice, with the 2009 Student Award, 2006–07 High School Award, and 2005–06 Student Award. This program highlights exceptional achievement in science, mathematics, and technology.

Pennsylvania System of School Assessment

The average scaled scores for Conestoga on the Pennsylvania System of School Assessment (PSSA) were among the highest in the state in 2008.

Extracurricular activities

Student Journalism

The Spoke 
Conestoga is home to a student-produced news website, Spoke.news (formerly Stoganews.com). It is produced by the staff of The Spoke, Conestoga's student run newspaper. The Spoke has been the recipient of several national awards.

The Pioneer 
The Pioneer is the Conestoga high school, student produced, award winning yearbook

TETV 
Conestoga is home to a student-run TV station TETV which broadcasts live sports game, ceremonies, concerts, in addition to student made content.

The Folio 
Conestoga is home to a literary magazine known as The Folio.

STEM Programs 
Conestoga's science department has numerous STEM clubs and activities. Among them are Science Olympiad, chemistry, biology, computer science, and robotics.

Academic competitions 
Conestoga is a part of Chester County Academic Competition league, the DECA business competition, as well as at the Pennsylvania State Career Development Conference.

Civic engagement 
In 2017, Conestoga was the first high school to receive the Pennsylvania Governor's Civic Engagement Award for registering 85% of eligible students to vote. In 2018, the students who ran the drive brought the organization "New Voters" to the national level.

Athletic teams
Conestoga competes in 17 different sporting events generally within the Central League.

PIAA State Championships 
 Girls Tennis
 Singles – 1987
 Doubles – 1991
 Team – 2021
 Boys Soccer – 1988, 2011, 2016, 2017, 2021
 Girls Soccer – 2007, 2008
 Boys Tennis
 Singles – 1989, 1990, 2012
 Doubles – 1966, 1972
 Team – 2011, 2012, 2013
 Girls Cross Country
 Individual – 2005
 Girls Swimming – 1980
 Boys Wrestling
 Individual
 119 lbs – 1994
 Boys Baseball – 2011
 Boys Lacrosse – 2010, 2011, 2012
 Girls Lacrosse – 2016, 2022
 Girls Track & Field
 Individual
 4×800m Relay – 2009, 2010
 1600 m Run – 2006
 1600 m Relay – 2004
 3200 m Relay – 2000
 Boys Track & Field
 Individual
 Shot Put – 2002

Athletic clubs

Fall
Archery
Ice Hockey
Ultimate Frisbee
Cross Country
Volleyball
Sailing

Winter
 Archery
 Ice Hockey
 Squash
 Chess

Spring
Archery
Crew
Rugby (Conestoga has the oldest High School Rugby program in the United States, founded in 1971 by Clarence Culpepper, who played for and coached the US National Men's Team.)
Ultimate Frisbee
Sailing

Notable alumni
 
Elizabeth Hoffman – 1964. Executive vice-president, Iowa State University, president emerita, University of Colorado System.
Craig Lucas – 1969. Tony Award nominated American playwright.
Johanna Schmitt – 1970. Distinguished Professor of Evolution and Ecology, University of California, Davis; Stephen T. Olney Professor of Natural History and Harrison S. Kravis University Professor, Brown University.
Robert Ellis – 1972. LA Times bestselling author.
Larry Krasner – 1979. 26th District Attorney of Philadelphia.
Grant Shaud – 1979. Actor.
Todd Glass – 1982. Comedian, actor.
Glenn R. Simpson – 1982. Journalist.
Melissa Shusterman – 1985. Member of the Pennsylvania House of Representatives.
Drew Endy – 1988. Bioengineering professor at Stanford University, founder of the Registry of Standard Biological Parts.
Gregg Foreman – 1990. Musician and actor.
Jennie Eisenhower – 1996. Actress, granddaughter of President Richard Nixon and great-granddaughter of President Dwight D. Eisenhower.
David Bush – 1998. Professional baseball player.
Marquis Weeks – 2000. Professional football player.
Abbi Jacobson – 2002. Actress and co-creator of Comedy Central television series Broad City.
Pat Heim – 2003. College lacrosse All-America Penn State '07, No. 1 overall pick Major League Lacrosse 2007 Draft player.
Kasie Hunt – 2003. Political correspondent.
Chris Hurst – 2005. Former TV Anchor and member of the Virginia House of Delegates.
P.T. Ricci – 2005. Major League Lacrosse player.
Mark Herzlich – 2006. Professional football player.
Mt. Joy – Indie folk/rock band featuring Matt Quinn (2009) and Sam Cooper (2007).
Roger Hobbs – 2007. International bestselling author of the books Ghostman and Vanishing Games.
Jake Cohen – 2009. American-Israeli basketball player for Maccabi Tel Aviv and the Israeli national basketball team
Emma Boettcher – 2010. Champion on Jeopardy! who ended James Holzhauer's 32-game-long winning streak.
Brian Chippendale – rock drummer and vocalist.
Christine Fan – singer and actress.
Keith Hughes – former Major League Baseball pitcher (1987–88; '90, '93)
Brendon Little – Major League Baseball pitcher for the Chicago Cubs
Tommy Shields – former Chicago Cubs infielder

References

External links

Conestoga's homepage
School profile
Program of Studies
District Schools
T/E School District homepage

Philadelphia Main Line
Public high schools in Pennsylvania
Eastern Pennsylvania Rugby Union
Educational institutions established in 1955
Schools in Chester County, Pennsylvania
1955 establishments in Pennsylvania